The Bangla Language and Literary Society, Singapore (BLLS) was established in 1994 with the goal to teach Bangla (Bengali) language to younger generations who grew up in Singapore.

References 

Bengali language
Society of Singapore
Language schools